Gentjana Rochi (also spelled Roki, born 17 September 1994) is a Macedonian footballer who plays as a striker for Finnish Naisten Liiga club Kuopion Palloseura and the North Macedonia women's national team.

Early life
Rochi was born to an ethnic Albanian family in Gostivar.

Club career
Rochi has played in the Macedonian Championship for FK Borec and ŽFK Naše Taksi, with which she also played the Champions League, and in the German 2nd Bundesliga for BV Cloppenburg.

International goals

References

1994 births
Living people
People from Gostivar
Macedonian women's footballers
Women's association football forwards 
BV Cloppenburg (women) players
Bayer 04 Leverkusen (women) players
2. Frauen-Bundesliga players
Frauen-Bundesliga players
North Macedonia women's international footballers
Macedonian expatriate footballers
Macedonian expatriate sportspeople in Germany
Expatriate women's footballers in Germany
Macedonian expatriate sportspeople in Finland
Expatriate women's footballers in Finland
Albanian footballers from North Macedonia